Patli Hajipur is a village in Gurgaon district of the Indian state of Haryana. It is located in Faruknagar taluk. , the village had a population of 4070 spread across 783 households. Women formed 47.9% of the population.

References 

Villages in Gurgaon district